Diplocoelus is a genus of beetles in the family Biphyllidae, containing the following species:

 Diplocoelus amplicollis Reitter, 1877
 Diplocoelus angustulus Blackburn, 1891
 Diplocoelus apicicollis Lea, 1921
 Diplocoelus atomus Grouvelle, 1916
 Diplocoelus bicolor Sharp, 1900
 Diplocoelus bombycinus Grouvelle, 1903
 Diplocoelus brunneus LeConte, 1863
 Diplocoelus consobrinus Grouvelle, 1905
 Diplocoelus costulatus Chevrolat, 1863
 Diplocoelus decemlineatus Lea, 1922
 Diplocoelus dilataticollis Lea, 1921
 Diplocoelus dubitabilis Grouvelle
 Diplocoelus exiguus Blackburn, 1891
 Diplocoelus fagi Guérin-Méneville, 1838
 Diplocoelus fasciatus MacLeay, 1903
 Diplocoelus fasciolatus Grouvelle
 Diplocoelus foveolatus Reitter
 Diplocoelus hispidus Grouvelle
 Diplocoelus humerosus Reitter, 1876
 Diplocoelus indicus Motschulsky, 1866
 Diplocoelus latus Lea, 1895
 Diplocoelus leai Blackburn, 1894
 Diplocoelus marginatus Grouvelle
 Diplocoelus mauritii Grouvelle, 1908
 Diplocoelus maximus Lea
 Diplocoelus opacior Blackburn, 1903
 Diplocoelus ovatus MacLeay, 1903
 Diplocoelus parnoides Grouvelle, 1903
 Diplocoelus parvus Sharp, 1900
 Diplocoelus pilinotatus Lea, 1922
 Diplocoelus platysomus Lea, 1922
 Diplocoelus probiphyllus Vitali, 2010 Baltic amber
 Diplocoelus punctatus Lea, 1895
 Diplocoelus rudis (LeConte, 1863)
 Diplocoelus sericens Lea, 1921
 Diplocoelus similis Grouvelle, 1898
 Diplocoelus simoni Grouvelle
 Diplocoelus talyshensis Nikitsky, 1993
 Diplocoelus tessellatus Reitter
 Diplocoelus turbinatus Grouvelle, 1905
 Diplocoelus villosus Grouvelle, 1905
 Diplocoelus xanthorrhoeae Lea, 1921

References

Biphyllidae
Cleroidea genera